Piracuí is traditionally known in the Amazon region as "farinha de peixe" (fish flour) and is traditionally made from crushed or shredded dried salted fish. The most common fishes are acari, also known as tamuatá and bodó, but piracuí can be made from other species of fish. It is eaten mixed with olive oil, onion and cassava flour. It also serves to make fried dumplings.

See also

 List of dried foods

References

Brazilian cuisine
Dried fish